Absidia glauca is a species of fungi belonging to the family Cunninghamellaceae.

It has cosmopolitan distribution.

References

Mucoraceae